Quercus litseoides is an uncommon Asian species of trees in the beech family Fagaceae. It has been found only in southern China, in the Provinces of Guangdong and Guangxi. It is placed in subgenus Cerris, section Cyclobalanopsis.

Quercus litseoides is a tree up to 10 meters tall. Leaves can be as much as 7 cm long.

The epithet "litseoides" refers to a resemblance between this tree and Litsea chinensis, now called Litsea glutinosa.

References

External links
line drawing, Flora of China Illustrations vol. 4, fig. 376, drawings 6-8 at upper left

litseoides
Flora of Guangdong
Flora of Guangxi
Plants described in 1909